James Hurdis (1763–1801) was an English clergyman and poet.

Life
Born in Bishopstone, East Sussex, Hurdis studied at St Mary Hall, Oxford, and Magdalen College, Oxford, later becoming a Fellow of Magdalen College.

Hurdis was curate for the East Sussex village of Burwash from 1786, and it was there that he wrote The Village Curate, a blank verse poem published anonymously in 1788. 

In 1791 he became the vicar of his home church at Bishopstone. The following year his sister Catherine died. In 1793 he was appointed Professor of Poetry at Oxford University.

Sussex shepherds at this time used to catch wheatears in small cage traps to sell as songbirds. Hurdis used to free the trapped birds, but would leave coins in their place.

Hurdis died in 1801 and there is a memorial to him in Bishopstone Church. The Town Council Offices were at Hurdis House named in his honour. His eldest son James Henry Hurdis was a notable amateur artist.

References

People from Seaford, East Sussex
1763 births
1801 deaths
18th-century English Anglican priests
Alumni of St Mary Hall, Oxford
Alumni of Magdalen College, Oxford
Fellows of Magdalen College, Oxford
Oxford Professors of Poetry
People from Lewes District